London Buses route 6 is a Transport for London contracted bus route in London, England. Running between Willesden Bus Garage and Aldwych, it is operated by Metroline.

History

In 1934, route 6 operated from Willesden to Leyton via Marble Arch, Oxford Circus,  Piccadilly Circus, Trafalgar Square and Aldwych. On 14 January 1942 it was withdrawn between Willesden and Kensal Rise. In May 1949, AEC Regent III RT buses were introduced.

On 25 October 1969, it was withdrawn between Hackney Wick and Leyton. On 18 July 1992, it was further cut, with the section between Aldwych and Hackney Wick replaced by new route 26.

On 27 March 2004, route 6, along with route 98, was converted to one man operation, with the AEC Routemasters replaced by Plaxton President bodied Volvo B7TLs. It was decided to run all journeys to Willesden garage, to provide a more consistent service along this corridor. However, the residents of Staverton Road, along which route 6's garage journeys passed (along with buses on route 52 and 302) objected to the increase in bus traffic. So the number of through journeys had to be limited to the previous level. The service has since been re-routed via Donnington Road and Pound Lane.

Throughout June 2015, new Volvo B5LH bodied Wright Eclipse Gemini 3s were allocated to the route. On 17 June 2017, route 6 was altered to operate via Park Lane and Piccadilly in lieu of Oxford and Regent Streets. Since the introduction of tendering, it has always been operated by Metroline from Willesden Garage.

On 23 November 2022, it was announced that route 6 would be rerouted to run to Victoria instead of Aldwych, following a consultation that proposed that it would run to Holborn. This change will be implemented by the end of 2023.

Current route
Route 6 operates via these primary locations: 
Willesden Garage
Willesden Sport Centre
Kensal Rise station 
Queens Park station  
Maida Hill
Warwick Avenue station 
Edgware Road station 
Marble Arch station 
Park Lane
Hyde Park Corner
Green Park station 
Piccadilly
Piccadilly Circus station 
Trafalgar Square
Charing Cross station  
Aldwych

References

External links

Bus routes in London
Transport in the City of Westminster
Transport in the London Borough of Brent